Henry Isaac Ergas  is an economist who has worked at the OECD, Australian Trade Practices Commission (now the Australian Competition & Consumer Commission) as well as at a number of economic consulting firms. He chaired the Australian Intellectual Property and Competition Review Committee set up by the Australian Federal Government in 1999 to review Australia's intellectual property laws as they relate to competition policy.

He was Adjunct Professor of Economics at the National University of Singapore and has taught at Harvard Kennedy School at Harvard University, the Centre for Research in Network Economics and Communications at the University of Auckland, Monash University and at the École nationale de la statistique et de l'administration économique in Paris. From 2009 to 2016, he was Professor of Infrastructure Economics at the University of Wollongong, and also served as Senior Economic Adviser to Deloitte Australia. He was an independent contributor to a paper submitted to the U.S. Federal Communications Commission which cautioned against imposing regulations that, while aimed at net neutrality, may cause costs that exceed the expected benefits.

In the 2016 Australia Day awards, Ergas was made an Officer of the Order of Australia for "distinguished service to infrastructure economics, and to higher education, to public policy development and review, and as a supporter of emerging artists". He is a columnist for The Australian newspaper.

Selected publications
 2016 "Tocqueville, Hancock and the Sense of History" in "Only in Australia. The History, Politics and Economics of Australian Exceptionalism", Oxford University Press.
 2016 (with Prof. Jonathan Pincus), "The Wealth of the Nation" in Menzies, the Shaping of Modern Australia, ed. J. R. Nethercote, Conor Court publishing in association with the Menzies Research Centre.
 2015 (with Prof. Jonathan Pincus), "Infrastructure and Colonial Socialism", in The Cambridge Economic History of Australia, eds. Simon Ville and Glenn Withers, Cambridge University Press, Cambridge, Massachusetts.
 2013 – (with Prof. Jonathan Pincus) "Have Mining Royalties been beneficial to Australia?", Economic Papers of the Economic Society of Australia, 33(1).
 2011 – "Some Economic Aspects of Mining Taxation" (with Prof. Jonathan Pincus and Dr. Mark Harrison) Economic Papers of the Economic Society of Australia, 29(4).
 2010 – "New policies create a new politics: issues of institutional design in climate change policy", Australian Journal of Agricultural and Resource Economics, April, Australian Journal of Agricultural and Resource Economics
 2008 – Wrong Number: Resolving Australia's Telecommunications Impasse, Allen & Unwin, Sydney.
 1987 – "Does Technology Policy Matter?" in Technology and Global Industry: Companies and Nations in the World Economy, National Academy of Engineering of the United States, National Academies Press, Washington DC. Reprinted in Stephan, Paula E.and David B. Audretsch, (eds.), in The Economics of Science and Innovation, vol. 2, Elgar Reference Collection, International Library of Critical Writings in Economics, vol. 117, Cheltenham, U.K. and Northampton, Massachusetts, pp. 438–492. Also available at https://ssrn.com/abstract=1428246.
 1984 – "Why Do Some Countries Innovate More than Others?", Centre for European Policy Studies, CEPS Papers No. 5. Also available at https://ssrn.com/abstract=1430184

Appointments
 2016 – Officer of the Order of Australia
 2013 – Member, NBN (National Broadband Network) Cost-Benefit Analysis and Review of Regulation Panel of Experts.
 2009 – Professor of Infrastructure Economics, SMART Infrastructure Facility, University of Wollongong
 2009 – Senior Economic Adviser, Deloitte Australia
 2005 – Member, Prime Minister's Taskforce on Export and Infrastructure
 2004 – Adjunct Professor, School of Economics, National University of Singapore
 2004 – Member, Australian Centre of Regulatory Economics (ACORE) Advisory Board
 2004 – Member, French Ordre national du Mérite
 2002 – Editorial Board, The Review of Network Economics
 2001 – Lay Member, High Court of New Zealand
 1999 – Chairman, Intellectual Property and Competition Review Committee, Attorney-General's Department, Australia
 1998 – Member, Commissione Scientifica, Telecom Italia, Rome, Italy
 1997 – Member, Advisory Panel on Telecommunications Reform to the Minister for Communications and the Arts, Australia
 1996–2007; 2013–2022 – Member, Association des Copains du Gouvernement (A.C.G.), Advisory Board

References

External links
 List of published papers, Social Science Research Network
 Profile and contributions, The Australian

Year of birth missing (living people)
Place of birth missing (living people)
Living people
Australian economists
Harvard Kennedy School staff
Academic staff of the University of Wollongong
Officers of the Order of Australia
The Australian journalists